The EP05 (also manufactured as ZNTKiM Gdańsk 44E) is a Polish modification of Czech electric locomotive EU05 used by Polish railway operator (PKP).

History
The locomotive was produced in the years 1957–1960 in three types: 20E1, the prototype, 30E1 and 30E2. In need of modern electric locomotives for passenger trains, and unable to get timely delivery of EU06 locomotives from England, Poland bought 30 locomotives from its southern neighbours.

First trials were made with the EU05-29 locomotive, and soon it became clear that it was possible to safely achieve speeds up to  after changing the transmission rate. The decision was made to rebuild all locomotives of EU05 class during first servicing. As a result, by 1977 almost all locomotives had been rebuilt to EP05 class, except for locomotives 09, 12 and 19, which had been scrapped earlier. To distinguish the new series from its predecessor, the color scheme was changed from two-tone green to orange. All modifications were conducted in Zakłady Naprawcze Taboru Kolejowego in Gdańsk.

In the beginning of the 1980s, EP05 was being prepared for pulling express trains. Most of the engines had had multiple steering and pneumatic devices installed, which allowed them to pull trains with two connected locomotives and operate automatic fixtures. Some of those engines later had their clutch changed from Secheron to Skoda.

Present day
Following the introduction of EP09 locomotives, EP05 started to be withdrawn from service, but due to several break downs of EP09 it was postponed. Today only one unit (EP05-23) of this locomotive still run under PKP Cargo, pulling InterCity trains. There is also one unit of EU05 left in service, which is in fact EP05-22 engine repainted in 2003. It serves as an exhibit in Kraków. As of 2018, it has been restored and re-entered regular service, at speeds of 160 km/h. EP05-23 Re-entered regular Service As an Active Exhibit In 2017. Repainted Back To The Orange Livery in the same year, EP05-23 unit is owned by PKP Intercity

Technical data
EP05 series locomotive is a passenger electric locomotive able to pull passenger trains. It has steering cabins on either end of the box. On a straight, horizontal track it could pull 600 t. passenger trains with a top speed of 160 km/h.

Nicknames
Piątka (eng. The Five) - from locos number
Czesio (eng. The Czech) - from name of country where was produced (Czech Republic)

See also
EU05
ChS3

References

Bo′Bo′ locomotives
3000 V DC locomotives
Polish State Railways electric locomotives
Standard gauge locomotives of Poland
Czechoslovakia–Poland relations
Bo′Bo′ electric locomotives of Europe